Einstein relation can refer to:

Einstein relation (kinetic theory), a kinetic relation found independently by Albert Einstein (1905) and Marian Smoluchowski (1906)
Mass–energy equivalence, sometimes called Einstein's mass-energy relation
Planck–Einstein relation, which relates the energy of a photon to its frequency